This is a list of navigable canals that are at least partially located in Russia.

See also
Transport in Russia
List of rivers of Russia

canals
 
Russia
Canals
Canals